Come What May (also titled Darling Buds of May and The Evacuation) is a 2015 French war drama film directed by Christian Carion. It stars August Diehl and Olivier Gourmet in lead roles, and was released on 4 November 2015. The film score was composed by Ennio Morricone.

Plot 
On 10 May 1940, the German Army invades Belgium and France via the Ardennes.

Frightened by the progress of the enemy, the people of the small village of Lebucquière decide, on the recommendations of the prefecture, to give up everything to go on the road, fleeing to the coast.

Among them is Paul, the village mayor. He leads the group, seeking to maintain a minimum of order and republican spirit in this nomadic life. Mado, his wife, plays music, trying to recreate the fragrance of life when friends would come to his coffee shop in the village.

Suzanne, a young teacher, acts as a scout to choose the least congested route. She supports a small German boy, Max, 8 years old, whose father Hans, an anti-Nazi dissident, was arrested by the French authorities following the declaration of war.

During the Battle of Arras, residents are released from prison and abandoned in the deserted city. Hans manages to flee the city, accompanied by a Scottish officer, Percy, whose entire unit died under German bullets.

These two will travel together. Hans seeking to recover his son who fled the village, and Percy hoping to reach the sea to find a boat back to England.

Cast
 August Diehl as Hans
 Olivier Gourmet as Paul
 Mathilde Seigner as Mado
 Alice Isaaz as Suzanne
 Matthew Rhys as Percy
 Jacques Bonnaffé as Roger
 Joshio Marlon as Max
 Laurent Gerra as Albert

Production 
En mai, fais ce qu'il te plaît was produced by Nord Ouest films and Pathé.

Accolades

References

External links 
 

2015 films
2015 war drama films
2010s French-language films
2010s German-language films
English-language French films
English-language German films
Pathé films
Films directed by Christian Carion
French war drama films
Films set in France
Films set in 1940
Western Front of World War II films
2015 drama films
2010s English-language films
2015 multilingual films
French multilingual films
2010s French films